Satans Kingdom is an unincorporated community in the town of Leicester in Addison County, Vermont, United States. It is located along Vermont Route 53 near the southern shore of Lake Dunmore and just north of Fern Lake.

Satans Kingdom was so named for their rocky soil which is unsuitable for farming. Satans Kingdom has been noted for its unusual place name.

References

Unincorporated communities in Vermont
Unincorporated communities in Addison County, Vermont